Martian Successor Nadesico is a science-fiction/comedy anime series that focuses on the exploits of a space battleship's inept crew in the 2196, in particular Akito Tenkawa, one of the ship's mecha pilots who actually wants to be a cook and who constantly finds himself the center of the affections of the female members of the crew.

It was created by Kia Asamiya, directed by Tatsuo Satō and produced by Production I.G subsidiary XEBEC. The series was first broadcast on TV Tokyo between October 1, 1996 and March 24, 1997, lasting 26 episodes. Afterwards, it spawned a series of computer games; a manga adaptation; a spin-off OVA called Gekiganger III; and a film sequel entitled Martian Successor Nadesico: The Motion Picture – Prince of Darkness. Six DVDs of the series, followed by a complete boxset, were released by ADV Films.

The opening theme tune to Martian Successor Nadesico, "You Get to Burning" was sung Yumi Matsuzawa, with the closing theme, "Watashi Rashiku [Being Myself]" sung by Houko Kuwashima.

Episodes

See also
List of Martian Successor Nadesico characters

References
General
Karuikane Mobile Interface Published by Nadesico: Project Schiaparelli. Last edited on 2005-04-01. Retrieved on 2005-10-10.

Specific

External links

Lists of anime episodes